The Suzuki G engine is a series of three- and four-cylinder internal combustion engines manufactured by Suzuki Motor Corporation for various automobiles, primarily based on the GM M platform, as well as many small trucks such as the Suzuki Samurai and Suzuki Vitara and their derivatives.

Straight-threes

G10/G10 Turbo

The G10 (sometimes referred to as the "G10A" to set it apart from the later G10B) is a  straight-three gasoline four-stroke engine using aluminum alloy for the block, cylinder head and pistons. It is equipped with either a carburetor or electronic fuel injection and was also offered as the G10T with an IHI RHB31/32 turbocharger and either MPFI or a carburetor. It has a single overhead camshaft driving six valves.

From 1984 to 1988 the standard G10 engine used a hemispherical head carbureted design with mechanical lifters. From 1989 to 2001 the engine received updates in the form of throttle-body fuel injection and hydraulic lifters. In the US, the G10 in the 2000 Chevrolet Metro became the last engine available on an American-sold vehicle to use throttle body injection for fuel delivery.

Through the 1985-1991 model years a turbocharged MPFI version of the G10 was offered in some markets. This turbocharged engine, with mechanical lifters, was available in both the US and Canadian Firefly/Sprint/Forsa from 1987-88. Only the Canadian Firefly/Sprint had this option, with hydraulic lifters, in the 1989-1991 model years. In the Japanese domestic market, the car was originally carbureted ( JIS at 5500 rpm,  at 3500 rpm) and went on sale in June 1984. It was a short-lived version, however, as by September 1988 the car was no longer on sale in the Japanese domestic market. As the only market in the world, Canada did continue to receive this engine for its versions of the second generation Cultus.

Because of the physics of the straight-three engine, the G10 tends not to idle as smoothly as other engines such as a straight-six engine. This engine has a non-interference valvetrain design.

Applications:
 1985–2001 Suzuki Cultus and global nameplate siblings: Chevrolet Sprint, Geo/Chevrolet Metro, Pontiac Firefly, Suzuki Swift, Suzuki Forsa
 November 1984– Suzuki Cultus AA41S AB41S
 1988– Suzuki Cultus AA43S AA43V AB43S AA44S AB44S
Ultralight aircraft
 ICP Savannah

Straight-fours

G10B
It was sold in both carburetted and MPFI form. It was widely used in motorsport in India due to its lightweight and tunability. The mounting points of the engine block were similar to that of the G13 and so an engine swap was a relatively easy task. It was phased out when production of Zen ceased in 2006. It was made only in India but was sold in all countries the Zen was sold.

 1993–2006 Maruti Zen (sold as Suzuki Alto in Europe, Australia).
 2007–2017 Suzuki Cultus hatchback (Pakistan)

G12
The G12B is an inline-four engine using aluminum alloy for the block, cylinder head and pistons. It has a SOHC 16V head and the fuel delivery is by multi-point fuel injection. It is BS6 (equal to early Euro 6) emissions compliant. It has lighter pistons and other detail improvements to be a more fuel efficient engine than the G13BB on which it is based. Maruti modified the engine to displace less than 1200 cc to take advantage of the reduced excise duty on such vehicles in India.

 2010–present– Maruti Eeco
 2016–present– Maruti Suzuki Super Carry (CNG only)

G13 series
The G13 is an inline-four engine using aluminum alloy for the block, cylinder head and pistons.

This engine was made with different valvetrain designs: 8 or 16 valve SOHC or 16 valve DOHC. All G13 engines have a bore and a stroke size of  except for the G13A engine which has a  stroke. There was also a  "G13C variant built in Indonesia, combining the longer stroke with a  bore.

G13A
The 1324 cc SOHC 8-valve G13A has a non-interference valvetrain design. Horsepower ranges from 60-70 PS with 90-100 N.m of torque.
 Bore x Stroke: 74mm x 77mm 
 Compression Ratio: 8.9:1
 Cylinder Block Deck Height: 186.8mm
 Cylinder Head Volume: 32.2cc
 Head Gasket Thickness (compressed): 1.2mm
 Intake Valve O.D. 36mm
 Exhaust Valve O.D. 30mm
 It was used in the following vehicles:
 November 1984–1988 Suzuki Cultus/Swift
 1984–1988 Suzuki Jimny 1300 (JA51)
 1985–1988 Holden Barina MB/ML (Australia/New Zealand)
 1986–1990 Suzuki Samurai
 1992–1998 Suzuki Margalla (Pakistan)

G13B
This 1298 cc DOHC 16-valve engine with bore and stroke of 74mm x 75.5mm (2.91 in x 2.97 in). Redline is set at 7400–7600 rpm. The compression ratio is between 10.0–11.5:1. This engine has an interference valvetrain design, making periodic timing belt changes vital to the engine's life. It was used in the following vehicles:
1985 Suzuki RS/1 (prototype)
 1986–1994 Suzuki Cultus/Swift GTi AA33S/AA34S

G13BA
It has 9.5:1 compression ratio and also a non-interference valvetrain design. 1995 to 1997 U.S. and Canadian-market engines gained hydraulic lash adjusters. It was used in the following vehicles:
 1989 Suzuki Sidekick (JA trim)
 1989–1993 Holden Barina - (carburetor:  at 6,000 rpm;  at 4,000 rpm)
 1989–1997 Suzuki Swift 
 1991–1995 Suzuki Samurai
 1991–2004 Chevrolet Swift
 1992–1997 Geo Metro
 1993–1998 Suzuki Jimny (JB31/32)
 1994–2000 Maruti Esteem
 1996–2004 Subaru Justy
 June 1994–March 2000 Maruti Gypsy King

G13BB
The G13BB uses a wasted spark arrangement of two coils bolted directly to the valve cover.
This engine uses a MAP sensor to monitor manifold pressure, similar to the G16B series. This engine has a non-interference valvetrain design. It uses the same G series block found in many other Suzuki models and so it is a popular conversion into the Suzuki Sierra/Samurai, which uses either a G13A (85-88) or G13BA (88.5-98). This allows the engine to fit into the engine bay simply as engine and gearbox mounts are identical and both engines are mounted North-South. It was used in the following vehicles:

 1995–2002 Suzuki Cultus Crescent
 1997–2003 Suzuki Swift
 1998–2001 Chevrolet Metro/Pontiac Firefly/Suzuki Swift
 1998–2003 Suzuki Jimny
 1998–2007 Maruti Esteem
 1999–2015 Changan Linyang
 2000–2004 Suzuki Every Landy/Carry 1.3
 2000–2017 Maruti Gypsy King
 2001–2004 Subaru Justy

G13C
This engine was developed by Suzuki's Indonesian subsidiary and also available for Malaysian market Suzuki Futura 1400. It was first used in the 1991 Suzuki Carry Futura. It was used in the following vehicles:
 1991–1999 Suzuki Carry Futura SL413 (ST130)

G13K
"G13K" is the JDM version of G13B. It has different cams, intake and exhaust manifolds and ECU with cutoff at 8600rpm. It makes 115 hp.
It was used in the Japanese version of Swift GTi called Cultus GT-i, replacing the first generation Swift GTi.

G15A
It has a  bore in conjunction with an  stroke. Applications:
 1991–1995 Suzuki Cultus sedan
 1995–2002 Suzuki Cultus Crescent/Baleno
 2000–2018 Suzuki Carry Futura (ST150, Indonesia)
 2004–present Suzuki APV (Indonesia/Pakistan)
 2011–2019 Suzuki Mega Carry (Indonesia)

G16
The G16 is an inline-four engine displacing . It shares the G15A's  bore, in a long block with a  stroke.

G16A
Either 8-valve SOHC carb or EPI before 1990 or 16-valve SOHC EPI after 1990. The 16-valve G16A mainly used in Japan and some selected markets. Applications:
 1989–1992 Suzuki Sidekick (8-valve)
 1988–1990 Suzuki Escudo (8-valve)
 1990–2000 Suzuki Escudo (16-valve)
 1990–2001 Suzuki Cultus sedan
 1996–1998 Suzuki X-90
 1997–2000 Suzuki Carry Futura (ST160, Indonesia)
 2005–present Suzuki APV (except for Indonesia and Pakistan)

G16B
The SOHC G16B was the 16-valve version of G16A for worldwide market. The Suzuki G16B engine features an aluminum cylinder block with wet liners and aluminum cylinder head, cylinder bore and piston stroke are 75.0 mm (2.95 in) and 90.0 mm (3.54 in), respectively. Compression ratio rating is 9.5:1. The G16B engine is equipped with Multi-point fuel injection (MPFI) and depending on year & market can have a distributor or distributorless ignition using two different styles of wasted spark coils.
Used in the following vehicles: 
 1992–2005 Suzuki Vitara
 1992–1997 Suzuki Cultus/Swift/Esteem
 1995–2002 Chevrolet Tracker (Americas)
 1995–2007 Suzuki Baleno/Esteem
 1996–1998 Geo Tracker
 1996–1998 Suzuki Sidekick

See also
 List of Suzuki engines

Notes

References 
 

G
Straight-three engines
Straight-four engines
Gasoline engines by model